Willian Roberto de Farias (born 6 June 1989), known as Willian Farias, is a Brazilian professional footballer who plays as a defensive midfielder for Coritiba.

Honours
Coritiba
Campeonato Paranaense: 2010, 2011, 2012, 2013
Campeonato Brasileiro Série B: 2010

Cruzeiro
Campeonato Mineiro: 2014
Campeonato Brasileiro Série A: 2014

Vitória
Campeonato Baiano: 2016, 2017

References 

1989 births
Living people
Footballers from Curitiba
Brazilian footballers
Brazilian expatriate footballers
Association football midfielders
Campeonato Brasileiro Série A players
Campeonato Brasileiro Série B players
UAE Pro League players
Coritiba Foot Ball Club players
Cruzeiro Esporte Clube players
Esporte Clube Vitória players
São Paulo FC players
Sport Club do Recife players
Hatta Club players
Expatriate footballers in the United Arab Emirates
Brazilian expatriate sportspeople in the United Arab Emirates